The 2017 Coral UK Open was a darts tournament staged by the Professional Darts Corporation. It was the fifteenth year of the tournament where, following numerous regional qualifying heats throughout Britain, players competing in a single elimination tournament to be crowned champion. The tournament was held for the fourth time at the Butlin's Resort in Minehead, England, between 3–5 March 2017, and has the nickname, "the FA Cup of darts" as a random draw will be staged after each round until the final.

Michael van Gerwen was the defending champion, but withdrew on the morning of the event with a back injury. Two-time runner-up and top seed Peter Wright won his first PDC major, defeating Gerwyn Price 11–6 in the final.

Format and qualifiers

UK Open qualifiers
There are six qualifying events staged in February 2017 to determine the UK Open Order of Merit Table. The tournament winners are:

The tournament is featuring 128 players. The results of the six qualifiers shown above were collated into the UK Open Order Of Merit. The top 32 players in the Order of Merit received a place at the final tournament. In addition, the next 64 players (without ties in this year's edition) in the Order of Merit list qualified for the tournament, but started in the earlier rounds played on the Friday. A further 32 players qualify via regional qualifying tournaments.

Top 32 in Order of Merit (receiving byes into third round)

*Michael van Gerwen withdrew on March 3 due to a back injury and was not replaced; the last player drawn in the third round got a bye.

Number 33–64 of the Order of Merit (receiving byes into second round)

Number 65–96 of the Order of Merit qualifiers (starting in first round)

Riley qualifiers (starting in first round)
32 amateur players qualified from Riley qualifiers held across the UK.

Prize money
The prize fund increased from last year's edition prize fund to £350,000.

Draw

Friday 3 March

First round (best of eleven legs)

Second round (best of eleven legs)

Third round (best of nineteen legs)

Saturday 4 March

Fourth round (best of nineteen legs)

Fifth round (best of nineteen legs)

Sunday 5 March

Quarter-finals (best of nineteen legs)

Semi-finals and Final (best of twenty-one legs)

References

UK Open
UK Open
UK Open
March 2017 sports events in the United Kingdom